The 2025 UEFA Women's Champions League Final will be the final match of the 2024–25 UEFA Women's Champions League, the 24th season of Europe's premier women's club football tournament organised by UEFA, and the 16th season since it was renamed from the UEFA Women's Cup to the UEFA Women's Champions League. The match will be played on 24 or 25 May 2025.

Host selection
On 21 June 2022, UEFA opened the bidding process for the final. The proposed venues must have natural grass and be ranked as a UEFA category four stadium, with a gross capacity of between 30,000 and 50,000 preferred. The bidding timeline is as follows:

21 June 2022: Applications formally invited
31 August 2022: Closing date for registering intention to bid
7 September 2022: Bid requirements made available to bidders
3 November 2022: Submission of preliminary bid dossier
23 February 2023: Submission of final bid dossier
May 2023: Appointment of host

Match

Details
The "home" team (for administrative purposes) will be determined by an additional draw (after the quarter-final and semi-final draws), at the UEFA headquarters in Nyon, Switzerland.

See also
2025 UEFA Champions League Final
2025 UEFA Europa League Final
2025 UEFA Europa Conference League Final

References

External links

2025
Final
Scheduled association football competitions
May 2025 sports events in Europe